= Las Flores, Culiacan =

Coordinates: 24.345°N 107.095°W

Las Flores is located in the municipality of Culiacán in the state of Sinaloa. It has a population of 345 people and it is 92 meters above sea level.

Las Flores is a small community with a Kindergarten, Pre-school, Church, a few grocery stores and a beer store. There is also a fruit packing shed on the school property. The town is made up of people from different states.
